William Maclay (March 22, 1765 – January 4, 1825) was a member of the United States House of Representatives from Pennsylvania.

Maclay was born in Lurgan Township, Pennsylvania.  He attended the country schools, studied law, was admitted to the bar in 1800 and commenced the practice of his profession at Chambersburg, Pennsylvania.  He was county commissioner of Franklin County, Pennsylvania, in 1805 and 1806.  He was a member of the Pennsylvania House of Representatives in 1807 and 1808, and served as associate judge for the Cumberland district in 1809.

Maclay was elected as a Republican to the Fourteenth and Fifteenth Congresses.  He died in Lurgan in 1825.  Interment in Middle Springs Cemetery.

Sources

The Political Graveyard

Members of the Pennsylvania House of Representatives
People from Chambersburg, Pennsylvania
1765 births
1825 deaths
Democratic-Republican Party members of the United States House of Representatives from Pennsylvania